

Princess of Leiningen 
This is a list of the ladies who have held the rank of princess consort as the wife of a Prince of Leiningen.

  
Leiningen